James A. Clark (?? - ??) was an American long-distance runner who is recognized as having set a world's best in the marathon on February 12, 1909 with a time of 2:46:52 at the Brooklyn Marathon. According to the New York Times, Clark also set an American record in a 20-mile race on November 14, 1909 (1:57:27 3-5).

Approximately 110,000 spectators were reported to have turned out to see 180 runners compete in the New Jersey Athletic Club Marathon. With "scorching heat" noted to have affected many of the athletes, Clark recorded a time of 3:22:07 that was good enough for third place behind James Crowley of the Irish American Athletic Club and Harry Jensen of the Pastime Athletic Club.

On October 12, 1909, Clark competed in a fifteen-mile run described as the "feature event" Columbus Day games organized by the Emerald Athletic Club in Westchester, New York. He placed third behind Jensen and F.P Devlin of the Mott Haven Athletic Club.

On November 27, 1909, Clark finished seventh in the third edition of the Yonkers Marathon (3:01:21). He ran for the Xaiver Athletic Club and was later elected the President of the Long Island Athletic Club.

Notes

References

Year of birth missing
Year of death missing
World record setters in athletics (track and field)
American male marathon runners
American male long-distance runners